Outdoor Indiana magazine, which debuted in 1934, is an outdoor magazine published by the Indiana Department of Natural Resources (DNR). It is published six times a year. Each issue spans 48 pages. 
 
The magazine is produced by the state agency's Division of Communications. The editor in chief is the communications director. Most articles are written by DNR staff. The magazine is designed by artists in the Division of Communications. Except for occasional historical photos, all photography is full color. Almost all photographs are produced by two Indiana DNR photographers. Freelance writers and photographers are occasional contributors. The magazine does not include advertising. 
 
The November–December issue includes a removable calendar featuring Indiana state photography and important outdoor events.

References

External links
 Indiana Department of Natural Resources 
 Outdoor Indiana magazine 

1934 establishments in Indiana
Advertising-free magazines
Bimonthly magazines published in the United States
Lifestyle magazines published in the United States
Local interest magazines published in the United States
Magazines established in 1934
Magazines published in Indianapolis